Françoise Lionnet serves as acting chair of the Committee on Degrees in Studies of Women, Gender and Sexuality at Harvard University, where she is professor of Romance languages and literatures, comparative literature, and African and African American studies. She is distinguished research professor of comparative literature and French and Francophone studies at UCLA, and a research associate of the Centre for Indian Studies in Africa at the University of Witwatersrand, Johannesburg. She served as director of the African Studies Center and Program Co-Director of UCLA's Mellon Postdoctoral Fellowship in the Humanities: Cultures in Transnational Perspective.

She is a leading scholar in Francophone and comparative literary studies, and has published groundbreaking work in the fields of feminist literature, postcolonial studies, autobiography, and African, African-American, Caribbean and Mascarene Island studies. She is the former president of the ACLA.

Early life
Lionnet was born in Mauritius, to a Franco-Mauritian and Seychellois family. She grew up speaking French and Creole, and learned English at the age of 4. This, in addition to the island's multicultural society and her diverse educational experience, has informed her research interests and comparatist approach throughout her career. Educated in Mauritius, Reunion Island, France, England, Germany, and the US, she received her PhD from the University of Michigan and was a postdoctoral fellow at the Cornell Society for the Humanities.

Career
Prior to joining Harvard in 2015, Lionnet taught at UCLA (1998–2015), where she chaired the French Department (1999–2005). She held the Pierce Miller Professorship in Literary Studies at Northwestern University until 1998. Her numerous honors include visiting and special professorships at Duke University, University of Nottingham, UK, and the EHESS in Paris. In 2015, she was the Mary Cornille Distinguished Visiting Professor, Newhouse Humanities Center, at Wellesley College.

Her most recent books include Ecriture féminines et dialogues critiques. Subjectivité, genre et ironie (Mauritius; l'Atelier d'écriture, 2012) and Le su et l'incertain: Cosmopolitiques créoles de l'océan Indien (Mauritius: L'Atelier d'écriture, 2012), which have been recognized in an article on UCLA Today. In 2018, she published Evariste Parny: Selected Poetry and Prose, on the Creole abolitionist poet from Reunion Island.

She has edited and co-edited volumes for literary journals including Yale French Studies, Signs, L'Esprit créateur, Comparative Literary Studies, MLN, and International Journal of Francophone Studies. In addition to editing, Lionnet has been a regular contributor to these and many other scholarly journals throughout her career.

Works

Selected awards
 Distinguished Lecturer, Center for African Studies, University of Bayreuth, Germany (2016)
 Distinguished Visiting Professor, Faculty of Arts and Social Sciences, Carleton University, Ottawa, Canada (2014)
 Distinguished Mellon Visiting Professor, Univ. of Witwatersrand, South Africa (2013)
 Principal Investigator, HED/USAID Grant for Educational Project in Rwanda (2012–15)
 Northrop Frye Distinguished Lecture, Univ. of Toronto (2010)
 Principal Co-PI, University of California Multi-Campus Research Group (2000–05)
 Principal Co-PI, "Cultures%20in%20Transnational%20Perspective"%20Postdoc%20Program%5D Mellon Foundation grant for the "Cultures in Transnational Perspective" Postdoc Program (2005–15)
 French Gov. Award: Chevalier de l'Ordre des Palmes Académiques, 2004
 Residency fellowship at the Rockefeller Foundation, Bellagio Center, June 2003
 Best Mentor Award from Women in French (WIF), 2002
 Professor Lionnet has held fellowships and grants from the Cornell Society for the Humanities, the American Philosophical Society, the Fulbright Foundation, the SSRC, the United Nations Fund (UNFPA), the UCHRI, the Humanities Research Institute at the University of California-Irvine, the Center for Advanced Feminist Studies at the University of Minnesota, and the NEH. 
 Director NEH/Northwestern Summer Institute in French Cultural Studies, 1995.

References
For more detailed information on Professor Françoise Lionnet, please see the following:
 Francoise Lionnet's Website
 Harvard Department of African and African American Studies Faculty

 Director of African Studies Center
 UCLA Department of Comparative Literature
 UCLA French and Francophone Studies Faculty
 Co-Director UCLA's Mellon Postdoctoral Fellowship in the Humanities
 Francoise Lionnet Biography PSU

University of California, Los Angeles faculty
Mauritian people of French descent
Mauritian people of Seychellois descent
University of Michigan alumni
Northwestern University faculty